Shri Venkateswara Matriculation Higher Secondary School is located in Srinivasapuram in the district of Thanjavur. It was started as a small school just with 13 students in West Main Street, Thanjavur in 1976. Now it runs with around 2000 students and so many sister schools.

High schools and secondary schools in Tamil Nadu
Education in Thanjavur district
Educational institutions established in 1976
1976 establishments in Tamil Nadu